Eva zu Beck (born Ewa Zubek; 26 April 1991) is a Polish travel blogger and vlogger. She hosted TRT World's show, A Place Called Pakistan, and presented a Euronews YouTube miniseries called Rerouted: The Balkans. She has travelled to 60 countries including Pakistan, where she lived for over a year, Afghanistan, Yemen and Iraq. She went viral after a controversial dance video in 2018 that was believed to have disgraced the national flag of Pakistan. Also, she joined BBC's The Travel Show as a presenter, reporting on the clean-up of the Mexican wetlands from the canals of Xochimilco.

In early 2022 she began a road trip of the Americas, living in a converted Land Rover Defender that she named Odyssey, which she transported from Germany to Mexico on a cargo ship, her goal being to drive to northern Alaska and then to the southern tip of South America. While waiting for her truck to be shipped, zu Beck flew to Antarctica in early February, 2022 where she was a among a group that climbed to the summit of Mount Vinson, the Antarctic's tallest peak.

American border detention
In late May, 2022, zu Beck attempted to legally enter the US from Nuevo Laredo, Mexico at the Texas border. To her surprise, zu Beck said she was interrogated, handcuffed and placed in a holding cell while  US Border Patrol officials searched her truck. Afterwards, she was permitted to enter the country. She later described the experience as "terrifying" in a YouTube video. She said border officials never offered an explanation for their unexpectedly rough treatment of her.

Personal life 
Zu Beck was born on 26 April 1991 in Poland. In early childhood, she moved to England. She studied German and French languages at University of Oxford.

According to her Instagram account, zu Beck fell in love with a man in Pakistan and remained there for a year. During that time, she also came to love Pakistan and returned for a short trip in 2022.

References 

1991 births
20th-century Polish people
Living people
Polish bloggers
Polish women bloggers
Polish television presenters
Polish women television presenters